The 2022 Villanova Wildcats football team represented Villanova University as a member of the Colonial Athletic Association (CAA) during the 2022 NCAA Division I FCS football season. They were led by sixth-year head coach Mark Ferrante and played their home games at Villanova Stadium.

Previous season

The Wildcats finished the 2021 season 10–3, 7–1 in CAA play to finish in a two-way tie for the CAA championship with James Madison. They received an at-large bid to the FCS Playoffs where, after a first round bye, they defeated Holy Cross in the second round before losing to South Dakota State in the quarterfinals.

Schedule

Game summaries

Lehigh

at LIU

at Army

Monmouth

at Maine

at No. 21 Richmond

Albany

Hampton

at Towson

at No. 8 William & Mary

No. 20 Delaware

References

Villanova
Villanova Wildcats football seasons
Villanova Wildcats football